The Panzerhaubitze 2000 ("tank howitzer 2000"), abbreviated PzH 2000, is a German 155 mm self-propelled howitzer developed by Krauss-Maffei Wegmann (KMW) and Rheinmetall in the 1980s and 1990s for the German Army. It is capable of a very high rate of fire; in burst mode it can fire three rounds in nine seconds, ten rounds in 56 seconds, and can—depending on barrel heating—fire between 10 and 13 rounds per minute continuously. The PzH 2000 has automatic support for up to five rounds of Multiple Round Simultaneous Impact (MRSI). Replenishment of shells is automated. Two operators can load 60 shells and propelling charges in less than 12 minutes. The PzH 2000 equips the armies of Germany, Italy, Ukraine, Netherlands, Greece, Lithuania, Hungary, Qatar and Croatia, mostly replacing older systems such as the M109 howitzer. In November 2019, a PzH 2000 L52 gun fired a shell a distance of 67 km.

Development 
In 1986, Italy, the United Kingdom and Germany agreed to terminate their existing development of the PzH 155-1 (SP70) programme, which had run into reliability problems and had design defects, notably being mounted on a modified tank chassis. A new Joint Ballistics Memorandum of Understanding (JBMOU) for a 52 calibre barrel (based on a UK proposal), to replace the 39 caliber design, was nearing an agreement. German industry was asked for proposals to build a new design with a gun conforming to the JBMOU. Of the proposed designs, Wegmann's was selected. Wegmann eventually won a contract in 1996 for 185 units to be delivered to Germany's rapid reaction force, followed by another 410 for the main force.

Wegmann and KraussMaffei, the two main German military tracked vehicle manufacturers, merged in 1998 to form KMW.

Design 
Rheinmetall designed the 155 mm 52-calibre JBMOU compliant rifled gun (60-rifles, right-hand spiral), which is chromium-lined over its entire 8 m length and includes a muzzle brake on the end. The gun uses a new modular charge system with six charges (five identical), which can be combined to provide the optimal total charge for the range to the target, as well as the conventional bagged charge systems. Primer is loaded separately via a conveyor belt, and the entire loading, laying and clearing are completely automated.

The maximum range of the gun is 30–36 km with the standard DM121 Boattail round, about 40–47 km with base bleed rounds, and 67 km with M2005 V-LAP assisted projectiles. In April 2006, a PzH 2000 fired assisted shells (Denel V-Lap) over a distance of 56 km with a probable maximum range of over 60 km. The gun can also fire the SMArt 155 artillery round used by Germany and Greece.

Wegmann supplied both the chassis, sharing some components with the Leopard 2, and the turret for the gun. The system has superb cross-country performance because of its use of continuous tracks and considerable protection in the case of counter-fire. The turret includes a phased array radar on the front glacis for measuring the muzzle velocity of each round fired. Laying data can be automatically provided via encrypted radio from the battery fire direction centre.

A lighter, more air-portable version developed by KMW and called the Artillery Gun Module uses the gun in a module fitted to a lighter chassis.

In December 2013, Raytheon and the German Army completed compatibility testing for the M982 Excalibur extended range guided artillery shell with the PzH 2000. Ten Excaliburs were fired at ranges from 9 to 48 km. Shells hit within 3 m of their targets, with an average miss distance of 1 m at 48 km. The Excalibur may be accepted by the German Army in 2014.

A PzH 2000 L52 gun fired a shell 67 km at the Alkantpan test range in South Africa on 6 November 2019.

In 2021, Germany and the Netherlands agreed to jointly define & execute a Mid-Life Update to the operational Pzh2000 in their inventories and ensure standardisation and availability.

Combat record and alterations

The PzH 2000 was used for the first time in combat by the Fire Support Command of the Royal Netherlands Army in August 2006 against Taliban targets in Kandahar Province, Afghanistan, in support of Operation Medusa. It was then used regularly in support of coalition troops in Uruzgan province. The PzH 2000 was also used extensively during the Battle of Chora. It was known as "the long arm of ISAF" and proved to be accurate and effective. However, the gun was criticised by the Dutch in Uruzgan province as the NBC system, designed for use in Europe, couldn't cope with the high level of dust in Afghanistan.

The guns have been modified with additional armor being fitted to the roof to protect against mortar rounds. There have been reports of other problems, including the need to keep it in the shade unless actually firing, the damage done when traveling on poorly built roads, and a significant 'cold gun' effect necessitating the use of 'warmers'.

Starting in June 2010, German ISAF troops at PRT Kunduz had three PzH 2000s at their disposal. They were first used on 10 July 2010 to provide support for the recovery of a damaged vehicle. This was the first time in its history that the Bundeswehr has used heavy artillery in combat. The PzH 2000 also played a key role during Operation Halmazag in November 2010, when the villages of Isa Khel and Quatliam were retaken from the Taliban by German paratroopers.

War in Ukraine 
On 21 June 2022, twelve Panzerhaubitze 2000s were deployed to Ukraine; seven came from Germany and five from the Netherlands. After a couple of weeks of intensive use, the guns required repairs, and error messages were being displayed as they are designed and built to fire no more than 100 shots a day. Germany considers 100 shots per day "a high-intensity mission". Ukraine has consistently exceeded this number, placing stress on the loading mechanism. Ukraine also fired "special ammunition at too great a distance." The Bundeswehr sent spare parts and a repair facility in Lithuania was chosen to repair the weapons. This came as Ukraine and KMW entered into a 1.7 billion euro deal to purchase 100 PzH 2000s.

Russian state news agency TASS reported that a Panzerhaubitze 2000 was destroyed by Russian forces in Kherson Oblast on 30 October 2022. However, the open-source intelligence site Oryx visually confirmed only repairable damage to one Panzerhaubitze.

Due to the intensity of artillery fire on the battlefield, Lithuania undertook to repair twelve of the howitzers, finishing repair work on six of them by December 2022. By this time, the number of Panzerhaubitze 2000 sent to Ukraine rose to twenty-two; fourteen from Germany and eight from the Netherlands. As of February 2023, fifteen of the howitzers were waiting to be repaired in Slovakia, but were being held up at the border for several weeks due to legal issues.

Operators

 : 16 ordered (second-hand from Germany); 12 to be modernized and overhauled, 3 for spare parts, 1 for training. Total value of the contract was 55 million euros. The first PzH 2000 was delivered on 29 July 2015. Agreement for the procurement was signed in 2014, deliveries were to take place between 2015 and 2016, howitzers to be introduced in service by 2019.
 : 185 delivered between 1998 and 2002. Fourteen units (7+3+4) were sent to Ukraine by October 2022. 16 sold to Croatia and 21 to Lithuania. 108 to remain in active service.
 : 25 ordered in 2001 and delivered between 2003 and 2004.
 : 24 were ordered in December 2018. As of December 2022 10 of them were delivered.
 : 70 ordered in 2002 and delivered between 2004 and 2008. 2 pre-production models were retired.
 : 21 delivered between 2015 and 2022. 17 active, 3 for spare parts, and 1 for training.
 : 57 ordered in 2002 delivered between 2004 and 2009, 5+3 were sent to Ukraine in 2022, 46 to be modernised (2024).
 : 24 ordered in 2013, first three delivered in 2015
: 22 delivered, 6 more planned by Italy. During the 2022 Russian invasion of Ukraine, an announcement was made on 20 April that five Dutch PzH 2000s would be transferred to Ukraine, with ammunition and training to be provided by Germany. On 6 May, it was announced that Ukraine would receive seven units from German army stocks which were undergoing maintenance. On 7 May, Chancellor Olaf Scholz agreed to supply the ammunition required, straight from industry to Ukrainian forces, without having to go through the German government for approval in the future. Training of Ukrainian artillery crews started on 11 May 2022 at the Bundeswehr's artillery school in Idar-Oberstein. On 21 June, Ukrainian Minister of Defence Oleksii Reznikov announced that the first PzH 2000s had entered Ukrainian service.Der Spiegel reported on 27 July that Germany had agreed to sell 100 more PzH 2000s to Ukraine. By this time, many PzH 2000 ammo loading mechanisms had broken down due to considerable strain: while the PzH 2000 is designed to fire 100 shells per day, the Ukrainians likely fired the gun much more often. In addition to shipping necessary spare parts to Ukraine, the German government was negotiating the creation of a repair center for its equipment in Poland. In October 2022, the howitzers were sent to Lithuania because Poland denied the German request for exclusive access to the Huta Stalowa Wola facilities, as it would halt all production in the factory (HSW manufactures and services Krab SPGs for Poland and Ukraine, among other weapon systems). Eventually, a planned repair center in Slovakia will shorten the route to and from the war zone in Ukraine.

Exports
A number of armies have tested the PzH 2000 system; its ability to provide accurate fire at 40 km has been a major selling point.

The PzH 2000 was considered for the US Army's Crusader concept system, but several requirements of the Crusader made it unsuitable. The Crusader specifications placed the crew and gun in separate compartments, allowing a single highly armoured crew compartment to control the firing of an entire battery of guns through intervehicle links. In addition, the Crusader included an automated ammunition tender, and an active cooled barrel.

The PzH 2000 was a contender for Phase 1C of Australia's Land 17 Artillery Replacement Programme, until that phase of the project was cancelled in May 2012.

Finland tested a PzH 2000 alongside the 155mm SpGH ZUZANA and AS-90 "Braveheart". Tests ended in 1998; more of the cheaper 155 K 98 field guns were bought instead of self-propelled systems.

The German Navy evaluated a modified system known as MONARC for installation onboard frigates; while the system performed well, components were difficult to protect against corrosion.
Sweden evaluated a slightly modified version, but selected the ARCHER Artillery System instead.

In December 2018, Hungary ordered 24 new-build PzH 2000s from Krauss-Maffei Wegmann, along with 44 Leopard 2A7+ and 12 Leopard 2A4 main battle tanks, in a deal valued at over 160 billion HUF (USD $565 million).

In June 2022, Germany and the Netherlands authorized the transfer of twelve Panzerhaubitze 2000s to the Armed Forces of Ukraine; the first was received on 21 June.

In September 2022, Germany announced the handover of four additional PzH 2000s to the Ukrainian Armed Forces.

Similar vehicles
 AS-90
 Bandkanon 1C
 2S35 Koalitsiya-SV, derived from Msta
 2S19 Msta, Msta S M K and other related
 Type 99
 M109 howitzer
 GCT 155mm
 K-9 Thunder
 AHS Krab
 T-155 Fırtına
 PLZ-05
 SSPH Primus
 Sholef

See also
 List of artillery
 K-9 Thunder
 Artillery Gun Module
 Archer Artillery System

Gallery

References

External links

 Armored Vehicles - PzH 2000
 Manufacturer's website (en)
 PzH 2000 Photos at Prime Portal
 Article on the Official Heer website (in German)
 Federation of American Scientists
 Military Today
 Dutch PzH 2000 Firing at Taliban Positions at Youtube

155 mm artillery
Field artillery of Germany
Military vehicles introduced in the 1990s
Post–Cold War artillery of Germany
Post–Cold War weapons of Germany
Rheinmetall
Self-propelled artillery of Germany
Tracked self-propelled howitzers